Biosatellite 1, also known as Biosat 1 and Biosatellite A, was the first mission in NASA's Biosatellite program. It was launched on December 14, 1966, by a Delta G rocket from Launch Complex 17A of the Cape Canaveral Air Force Station into an orbit with a  perigee,  apogee, and 33.5 degrees of orbital inclination, with a period of 90.5 minutes.

Biosatellite 1 was carrying several specimens for studying the effects of the space environment on biological processes. Prior to reentry, the entry capsule separated from the satellite bus properly, but the deorbit motor failed to ignite, leaving it stranded in a slowly decaying orbit. It re-entered and disintegrated on February 15, 1967.

Experiments
 Effects of Weightlessness on Wheat Seedling Morphogenesis and Histochemistry	
 Growth Physiology of the Wheat Seedling in Space
 Biochemical Changes in Developing Wheat Seedling in Weightless State
 Effects of Weightlessness of the Dividing Egg of Rana Pipiens
 Mutational Response of Habrobracon
 Liminal Angle of a Plagiogeotropic Organ under Weightlessness
 Effects of Radiation and Weightlessness on Tribolium Pupae
 Effects of Weightlessness on Radiation Induced Somatic Damage in Drosophila
 Effects of Space Environ on Radiation- Induced Damage to Repro Cells of Pupae	
 Genetic and Cytologic Studies of Tradescantia Irradiated During Flight
 Combined Effects of Weightlessness and Radiation on Inact.+Mutation-Induct
 Spc Flt Eff-Gamma Rad Interaction on Growth+Induction of Lysogenic Bacteria	
 Effects of Weightlessness on Amoeba, Pelomyxa Carolinensis

References

1966 in spaceflight
Biosatellites
Spacecraft launched in 1966
Spacecraft which reentered in 1967
Spacecraft launched by Delta rockets